Animal-Vegetable-Mineral Man is a fictional character appearing in American comic books published by DC Comics. He is a foe of the original Doom Patrol.

The character made his first live adaptation on the first season of the Doom Patrol television series on DC Universe played by Alec Mapa. His name is based on a lyric from the song "Modern Major General".

Publication history
Animal-Vegetable-Mineral Man first appeared in The Doom Patrol #89 (August 1964) and was created by Arnold Drake and Bruno Premiani.

Fictional character biography
Sven Larsen is a Swedish scientist and a former student of Dr. Niles Caulder, but they had a falling out after Larsen accused Caulder of stealing his idea for the anti-decay ray. Larsen gains his superpowers after falling into a vat of amino acids. This gave him the right arm and leg of a plant, the left arm and leg of diamonds, and a half-torso of a Tyrannosaurus with half of his human head shown to be fused with part of the Tyrannosaurus' neck. He uses his powers to get revenge on Caulder and his Doom Patrol. The Doom Patrol defeat Larsen and are able to remove his powers. He later regains them and fights the Doom Patrol again.

Larsen returns to face the second incarnation of the Doom Patrol in The Doom Patrol (vol. 2) #15 (December 1988) and #16 (Winter 1988), in partnership with General Immortus. He is defeated after Celsius encases him in ice.

In a 2009 interview with Keith Giffen about his Doom Patrol comic, Giffen reveals that Larsen should be a villain in it.

In the twelfth issue of the series, Larsen is now a member of the Front Men, a team of super-powered guards working for Mister Somebody Enterprises. His team is working to discredit the Doom Patrol, having been coached in various ways on how to make the heroes look bad for the cameras. Unknown to the Front Men, Mister Somebody has rigged their uniforms to deliver fatal blows in ways that make it seem as if the Doom Patrol killed them intentionally.

In 2011, "The New 52" rebooted the DC universe. Animal-Vegetable-Mineral Man is re-introduced as part of an experimental security measure that Niles Caulder unleashes on intruders when his underground complex is breached.

In the "Watchmen" sequel "Doomsday Clock", Animal-Vegetable-Mineral Man is listed as a member of India's sanctioned superhero team called the Doomed in light of "The Superman Theory" that started a metahuman arms race. He gained a reputation there where he ate their foes. He was with the Doomed when they alongside the Outsiders and the People's Heroes tried to bring Superman in for what happened in Russia.

Powers and abilities
The Animal-Vegetable-Mineral Man can change any part of his body into animal, vegetable, or mineral forms, as well as combining several more at once. In most appearances, he possesses extensive knowledge of biology.

In other media

Television
 Animal-Vegetable-Mineral Man appears in the Batman: The Brave and the Bold episode "The Last Patrol!", voiced by Dee Bradley Baker.
 Animal-Vegetable-Mineral Man appears in Doom Patrol, portrayed by Alec Mapa. This version is a tourist named Steven Larson who travels to Paraguay in the hopes of receiving magnetic feet from Nazi scientist Heinrich Von Fuchs, only to accidentally remain in Von Fuchs' machine for too long and transform into Animal-Vegetable-Mineral Man, gaining a separate Velociraptor head along with his own in the process. Following this, he becomes a bumbling supervillain known for a disastrous convenience store robbery, a subsequent arrest, and a failed assassination attempt on his life carried out by an admirer of Von Fuchs before becoming the author of a best-selling autobiography called My Side.

Miscellaneous
 Animal-Vegetable-Mineral Man appears in Teen Titans Go!.
 Animal-Vegetable-Mineral Man makes a cameo appearance in Batman: The Brave and the Bold #7.

References

External links
 Animal-Vegetable-Mineral Man at DC Database

Characters created by Arnold Drake
Comics characters introduced in 1964
DC Comics male supervillains
DC Comics characters who are shapeshifters
DC Comics characters who can move at superhuman speeds
DC Comics characters with superhuman strength
DC Comics hybrids
DC Comics metahumans
DC Comics scientists
Doom Patrol
Fictional biologists
Fictional Swedish people
Fictional cannibals